On 21 September 1949 at Goodison Park, Liverpool, the home of Everton, England were defeated 2–0 by Ireland in a friendly international. As a result, Ireland became the first foreign team to beat England at home. In 1953, the Hungarian team known as the Mighty Magyars defeated England 6–3, to become the second team to do so.

Previous games
During the 1940s, there were in effect, two Ireland teams, chosen by two rival associations—the Northern Ireland-based Irish Football Association (IFA) and the Republic of Ireland-based Football Association of Ireland (FAI). Both organisations claimed jurisdiction over the whole of Ireland, and selected players from the whole island. As a result, several notable Irish players from this era had played for both teams. The IFA XI had played England regularly since 1882, and claimed their first victory, by a score of 3–0, on English soil at Ayresome Park, Middlesbrough on 14 February 1914, but this was only the second time England and the FAI XI had met. Despite this, several members of the FAI XI had played against England several times before while representing the IFA XI; striker Davy Walsh had previously scored three times against England.

The FAI XI had played England for the first time at Dalymount Park on 30 September 1946. A team, featuring Johnny Carey, Con Martin and Billy Walsh, were narrowly defeated 1–0 when Tom Finney scored the winner in the 82nd minute. Two days earlier, on 28 September, Carey and Tom Aherne had been included in the IFA XI that had been heavily defeated 7–2 by the same England side. The next time the IFA XI played England, on 5 November 1947, their team included six players—Carey, Martin, Billy Walsh, Peter Farrell, Davy Walsh and Tommy Eglington—who had previously played for the FAI XI.  Davy Walsh scored the opening goal in a 2–2 draw at Goodison Park. Carey, Martin, Farrell and Walsh also played for the IFA XI in their 6–2 defeat by England at Windsor Park on 10 October 1948. Davy Walsh also scored both goals that day.

The teams
The game was used by both teams as part of their preparations for forthcoming World Cup qualifiers. Despite the absence of both Stanley Matthews and Stan Mortensen, England fielded a strong team, including Billy Wright, Neil Franklin, Wilf Mannion and Tom Finney. Ireland's team included just seven First Division players, but these included Johnny Carey who had been voted Footballer of the Year in 1949. Another two Irish players, Tom Aherne and Tommy Moroney, like Finney, played in the English Second Division. The remaining two Irish players, goalkeeper Tommy Godwin and Tommy O'Connor both played for Shamrock Rovers in the League of Ireland.

Match

Summary 
The early pattern of the game saw England launch wave after wave of attacks. However Tommy Godwin was in inspired form and Con Martin, Tom Aherne and Johnny Carey proved to difficult for England to get past. Carey was also effective in keeping Tom Finney quiet, while wing-halves Billy Walsh and Tommy Moroney gradually took the sting out of the English front line. Ireland took the lead in the 33rd minute when Peter Desmond, after collecting a pass from Tommy O'Connor, burst into the England penalty area and was brought down. Con Martin then converted the subsequent penalty kick. During the second half the wave of England attacks continued. Peter Harris hit the bar and Jesse Pye also went close. However Peter Farrell, playing at his club Everton's home ground, made victory certain in the 85th minute. O'Connor slipped the ball to Farrell and as the English goalkeeper Bert Williams advanced, Farrell lofted the ball into the net.

Details

Sources
The Boys in Green - The FAI International Story (1997): Sean Ryan

See also
1929 Spain v England football match

References

External links
  Highlights of Game at www.youtube.com
   Article at Republic of Ireland fansite
  Article at Everton fansite
  Historic Day, 21 September 1949
 England International Results at Rsssf
 Picture of Ireland team

Eng
Ire
Republic of Ireland national football team matches
England national football team matches
1940s in Liverpool
September 1949 sports events in the United Kingdom
International association football matches